Telesma is an American, Baltimore, Maryland-based musical group, playing in the psychedelic rock, world music, progressive rock, and trance music genres. A "telesma" is either a talisman or the energy with which a talisman is charged. Founded in 2002, the band performs at festivals and other venues across the country, mostly in the Eastern half of the United States.

Current roster
Band:
 Ian Hesford (didgeridoo, kubing, dumbek, percussion)
 Jason Sage (keyboards, vocals, percussion, programmer)
 Joanne Juskus (vocals, percussion, karatalas)
 Chris Mandra (guitar, analog guitar synth, the manDrum, and vocals)
 Bryan "Jonesy" Jones (6 string MIDI & upright basses, theremin, percussion)
 Mike Kirby (drum kit, percussion, electronic drums)

Additional artists/performers:
 Indra Lazul (belly dancers)
 Patricia Tamariz (body painter)
 Adam Scott Miller (visual artist)
 Alex & Allyson Grey (visual artist)
 Jeremy Opio (visual artist)

Biography
Telesma's  sound, often labeled “electro-acoustic psychedelic world dance music”, is driven by the ancient sound of the didgeridoo, the kubing (bamboo mouth harp), tribal drums and percussion, and the human voice. The group's work include albums “O(h)M” (2007), “Hearing Visions: Live” (2009), “Action In Inaction” (2012), and five song EP “Decade Dance” (2014) all released on their independent label “sTRANGELY cOMPELLING mUSIC”.

Collaborations
Telesma has collaborated with several other artists. They co-created the 2008 Visionary Gathering in Baltimore with Alex Grey, releasing a CD and DVD of the event entitled Hearing Visions: Live, and worked on other projects with him at The Chapel of Sacred Mirrors (CoSM).

From 2010–present, Telesma collaborated with visual artist Adam Scott Miller on creating video content for their live projection show. As well as having Adam paint live with the band on several occasions. In 2012, Adam created the "LOTUS-CHAIN" video project which includes 3 videos for the Telesma songs "Chain", "White Lotus" and a 3rd song TBA.

Other artists that Telesma has performed with include Shpongle, Beats Antique, EOTO, Papadosio, Consider The Source, David Tipper, ArcheDream For Human-Kind, Delhi2Dublin, Woodland, Bernie Worrell, Cyro Baptista & Beat the Donkey, See-I (featuring members of Thievery Corporation), Faun, Eliot Lipp, Jim Donovan (Rusted Root), The Gypsy Nomads, and HuDost.

Venues
Some of the event venues Telesma has performed at include: Camp Bisco, Levitt Pavilion SteelStacks, Artscape, the Starwood Festival, Faerieworlds, PEX Summerfest, Spoutwood Fairie Festival, EvolveFest, FaerieCon, Raw Spirit Gathering, Culturefest, Karmafest, Maryland Faerie Festival, Alex Grey's Chapel of Sacred Mirrors (CoSM), Free Spirit Gathering, Primal Arts Festival, the Baltimore PowWow, Phanphest, SoWeBo Festival, Nelson's Ledges, and WIYY 98Rock’s Summer Concert Series.

Discography
 2007 - O(h)M
 2008 - Hearing Visions: Live
 2012 - Action/in/Inaction
 2014 - "Decade Dance"

Filmography
 2008 - Hearing Visions: Live DVD

References
 Aural Stimulation at its Finest by Michael Macey, May 5, 2009, Chesapeake Music Guide
 A Decibel Disparate: Synethesia’s Entrancing Sound – Telesma by Brianne Leith, April 1, 2011, The Annapolis Sound
 Meet Telesma by Zach Wilson, May 11, 2010, The Funk Box
 Meet the Band: Telesma by Annie Linskey, July 29, 2004, The Baltimore Sun
 Music Box: Baltimore Band Telesma Setting the Country on Fire by Michael Buckley, 4/19/2012, Capital Gazette
 Telesma by Dana Sobel, 9/9/2011, On the Verge: Relix Magazine
 Telesma Channels the Spirit, March 22, 2010, The Painting Queen
 Telesma LOVEfest by Justin Allen, 2/16/2011, What Weekly
 What do Didgeridoo, Dumbeks, Kubings and Karatalas Have in Common? by Debbie Snyder, Lehigh Valley InSite
 World Beat is Not Enough: Baltimore’s Telesma Digs into the Elusive Vibes of Indigenous Music by Robbie Whelan, January 5, 2005, Baltimore City Paper

Musical groups from Baltimore
Musical groups established in 2002
American psychedelic rock music groups
Jam bands
Neo-psychedelia groups
Freak folk
2002 establishments in Maryland